Prayers of Steel is the debut full-length album released by the German heavy metal band Avenger in 1985, before they changed their name to Rage. The only other release that followed under the name Avenger was the EP Depraved to Black (also 1985). German label GUN Records reissued the album on CD in 1995, including the track of the EP.

The opening track "Battlefield" was later re-recorded in the Extended Power EP, while the title track "Prayers of Steel" was re-recorded for 10 Years in Rage. Other songs from this album were later re-recorded for Rage's Seasons of the Black album in 2017.

Track listing

Personnel 
Peter "Peavy" Wagner – vocals, bass guitar
Jochen Schroeder – guitars
Alf Meyerratken – guitars
Jörg Michael – drums

Production
Ferdinand Köther – producer
Ralph Hubert – engineer
Ulli Schnarre – tape operator and mixing

References 

1985 debut albums
Rage (German band) albums